Jean-Noël Grinda (born 5 October 1936) is a former French international tennis player.

He competed in the Davis Cup a number of times, from 1959 to 1964 and in the Australian Open two times, in 1954 and 1965.

Grinda belongs to a celebrated Nice family. He married the daughter of :fr:Jean Michard-Pellissier. He is today known as a skilled backgammon player.

References

External links
 
 
 

1936 births
Living people
French male tennis players
Tennis players from Paris
Grand Slam (tennis) champions in boys' singles
French Championships junior (tennis) champions
20th-century French people